Trevor Canfield (born  January 10, 1986) is a former American football guard. He was drafted by the Arizona Cardinals in the seventh round of the 2009 NFL Draft. He played college football at Cincinnati. Canfield was also a member of the Seattle Seahawks, Detroit Lions, and New York Jets.

Professional career

Arizona Cardinals
Canfield was one of the last picks of the 2009 NFL Draft, selected 254th overall by the Arizona Cardinals. He stayed with the Cardinals past the final round of roster cuts and into the regular season as a member of the practice squad before the Seahawks signed him to their active roster.

New York Jets
On August 5, 2011, Canfield signed with the New York Jets. He was waived on September 2. Canfield was re-signed to the team's practice squad on September 4. Canfield was released from the practice squad on September 19.

Canfield was signed by the Jets to a reserve/future contract on January 21, 2012. He was waived on May 3.

References

External links
Official Website
Cincinnati Bearcats bio
Arizona Cardinals bio

1986 births
Living people
Players of American football from Cincinnati
American football offensive guards
Cincinnati Bearcats football players
Arizona Cardinals players
Seattle Seahawks players
Detroit Lions players
New York Jets players